4606 Saheki, provisional designation , is a stony Flora asteroid from the inner regions of the asteroid belt, approximately 7 kilometers in diameter.

The asteroid was discovered on 27 October 1987, by Japanese astronomer Tsutomu Seki at Geisei Observatory, Japan. It was later named after Japanese astronomer Tsuneo Saheki.

Classification and orbit 

Saheki is a member of the Flora family, one of the largest families of stony asteroids. It orbits the Sun in the inner main-belt at a distance of 2.0–2.5 AU once every 3 years and 5 months (1,234 days). Its orbit has an eccentricity of 0.10 and an inclination of 3° with respect to the ecliptic. The first precovery was taken at Palomar Observatory in 1953, extending the asteroid's observation arc by 34 years prior to its discovery.

Physical characteristics

Rotation period 

In January 2009, a rotational lightcurve of Saheki was obtained from photometric observations by David Higgins at Hunters Hill Observatory, Australia. Lightcurve analysis rendered a well-defined rotation period of  hours with a brightness variation of 0.56 in magnitude.

Two months later, in March 2009, a second lightcurve was obtained at the Via Capote Observatory , California.

Spin axis 

In 2013, an international study modeled a lightcurve with a concurring period of 4.97347 hours and found a spin axis of (44.0°, 59.0°) and (222.0°, 68.0°) in ecliptic coordinates (λ, β), respectively.

Diameter and albedo 

According to the survey carried out by the NEOWISE mission of NASA's Wide-field Infrared Survey Explorer, Saheki has a high albedo of 0.33 and a diameter of 6.7 kilometers, while the Collaborative Asteroid Lightcurve Link calculates a diameter of 7.1 kilometers, based on an assumed albedo of 0.24, derived from 8 Flora, the Flora family's namesake and largest member.

Naming 

This minor planet was named after Japanese astronomer and president of the Toa Astronomical Society, Tsuneo Saheki (1916–1996). Over half a century, Saheki as gathered large inventory of observational data of the planet Mars. The Martian crater Saheki is also named in his honour. The official naming citation was published by the Minor Planet Center on 28 May 1991.

Notes

References

External links 
 Asteroid Lightcurve Database (LCDB), query form (info )
 Dictionary of Minor Planet Names, Google books
 Asteroids and comets rotation curves, CdR – Observatoire de Genève, Raoul Behrend
 Discovery Circumstances: Numbered Minor Planets (1)-(5000) – Minor Planet Center
 
 

004606
Discoveries by Tsutomu Seki
Named minor planets
19871027